Koumansetta is a small genus of gobies native to the Indian Ocean and the western Pacific Ocean. The name of this genus honours the Dutch ichthyologist and goby taxonomist Frederik Petrus Koumans (1905-1977) of the Rijksmuseum van Natuurlijke Historie in Leiden, Netherlands, who had written a description of Koumansetta rainfordi following a visit to the Australian Museum in Sydney in 1938 but did not name it. The outbreak of World War II meant that Whitley's correspondence with Koumans was interrupted, so he named this genus after him, noting “which will enshrine memories of happier days of our meetings in Leiden and Sydney”.

Species
There are currently two recognized species in this genus:
 Koumansetta hectori (J. L. B. Smith, 1957) (Hector's goby)
 Koumansetta rainfordi Whitley, 1940 (Old glory, Court Jester Goby)

References

External links
 World Register of Marine Species
 uBio

 
Gobiinae
Taxa named by Gilbert Percy Whitley